Furkan Doğan (20 October 1991 – 31 May 2010) was a Turkish American who was residing in Turkey permanently. He was the youngest person killed by the IDF on the MV Mavi Marmara, in the Gaza flotilla raid and became a political symbol after his death.

Early life
Furkan Doğan was born to ethnic Turkish parents in Troy, New York in the United States and moved to Turkey at the age of two.

He was a high school student at Kayseri Özel Hisarcıklıoğlu Fen Lisesi in Kayseri, Turkey. He wanted to study medicine. He had planned to visit New York in the summer of 2010.

His father, Ahmet Doğan, who graduated from Rensselaer Polytechnic Institute with an MBA in accounting, is an assistant professor of accounting at Erciyes University.

Gaza flotilla and Doğan's death
Dogan was not intensely interested in politics, and his participation in the Gaza Freedom Flotilla, was volunteered by himself. He was killed in the Gaza flotilla raid. In his final diary entry written on the ship, he wrote about the beauty of martyrdom:
"It is the last hours to martyrdom, insha'Allah. I am wondering if there is a more beautiful thing. The more beautiful thing is only my mother, but I'm not sure. The comparison is very difficult. Martyrdom or my mother? Now, the hall has been evacuated. So far people were not serious, but they have become serious recently."

An autopsy revealed he had suffered five gunshot wounds, to the nose, back, back of the head, left leg, and left ankle, at a distance of 45 centimeters. A UNHCR concluded he was also shot at after he fell wounded on the floor. He was shot when he was filming the events in the ship. This video was also posted at the on-line news collective This Can't Be Happening: 

The US alleges the autopsy report was never handed over to US authorities despite repeated requests to that effect.

Reactions to his death
On 3 June 2010, US Secretary of State Hillary Clinton confirmed his death and said U.S. officials had met with Doğan's father to express their condolences. Clinton said, "Protecting the welfare of American citizens is a fundamental responsibility of our government and one that we take very seriously. We are in constant contact with the Israeli Government, attempting to obtain more information about our citizens."

U.S. authorities in Turkey have offered U.S. consular services. His funeral service was held at the Fatih Mosque in Istanbul on 3 June 2010

The American Muslims for Palestine (AMP) condemned the attack. The Christian Science Monitor reported that his US citizenship may make it difficult to avoid a diplomatic confrontation between the US and Israel.

The Turkish prime minister, Recep Tayyip Erdoğan, criticized the USA Government for being silent after Doğan's death. He asked: "Why is his death not followed by the USA, is it because of his Turkish origin?"

Center for Constitutional Rights lawsuit
In May 2011, the Center for Constitutional Rights filed a Freedom of Information Act lawsuit against the U.S. government to release documents related to its knowledge and role in the attack, which it has thus far blocked.

References

Israel–United States relations
Deaths by firearm in international waters
People from Troy, New York
American people of Turkish descent
American emigrants to Turkey
1991 births
2010 deaths
Gaza flotilla victims